The water polo tournaments at the 2020 Summer Olympics took place at the Tokyo Tatsumi International Swimming Center in Kōtō. Twenty-two teams (twelve for men and ten for women) competed in the tournament, an increase of two from the previous editions.Men's Water polo was also the last final played before the closing ceremony.

It was originally scheduled to be held in 2020, but on 24 March 2020, the Olympics were postponed to 2021 due to the COVID-19 pandemic.

Schedule
The match schedule as of 9 March 2021.

Qualification

Qualification summary

Men's qualification

Women's qualification

Medal summary

Medal table

Medalists

Men's tournament

Preliminary round

Group A

Group B

Knockout stage

Final standings

Women's tournament

Preliminary round

Group A

Group B

Knockout stage

Final standings

References

Sources
 Water Polo – Olympic Schedule & Results | Tokyo 2020 Olympics 
 Water Polo – Olympic Reports | Tokyo 2020 Olympics
 Water Polo – Official Results Book | Tokyo 2020 Olympics (archive)
 Water Polo – Medal Standings | Tokyo 2020 Olympics
 Water Polo – Medallists by Event | Tokyo 2020 Olympics

External links
 Water Polo | Tokyo 2020 Olympics 
 Tokyo 2020 | FINA

 
International aquatics competitions hosted by Japan
2020
2020 Summer Olympics events
2021 in water polo